"Chapter Four: Commit... to YOU" is the fourth episode of the first season of the American dark comedy crime television series Barry. The episode was written by co-producer Sarah Solemani, and directed by Maggie Carey. It was first broadcast on HBO in the United States on April 15, 2018.

The series follows Barry Berkman, a hitman from Cleveland who travels to Los Angeles to kill someone but finds himself joining an acting class taught by Gene Cousineau, where he meets aspiring actress Sally Reed and begins to question his path in life as he deals with his criminal associates such as Monroe Fuches and NoHo Hank. In the episode, Barry reconnects with an old friend from the Marines, although his relationship with Sally may take a turn for the worse. Meanwhile, Moss meets with Gene for information on Ryan Madison's murder, although Gene uses it as a date instead.

According to Nielsen Media Research, the episode was seen by an estimated 0.511 million household viewers and gained a 0.2 ratings share among adults aged 18–49. The episode received positive reviews from critics, who praised the character development and performances, with many highlighting Henry Winkler. For this episode, Winkler won the Primetime Emmy Award for Outstanding Supporting Actor in a Comedy Series at the 70th Primetime Emmy Awards.

Plot
Sally (Sarah Goldberg) creates a Facebook profile for Barry (Bill Hader) using his stage name "Barry Block". Barry decides to search for an old military friend, Chris Lucado. Sally states she will miss the acting class that day, as her agent gave her another audition, but they plan to meet at a party held that night by Natalie (D'Arcy Carden). Barry later receives a message from Chris, who wants to meet with him.

Barry rendezvous with Fuches (Stephen Root), who has been released. Fuches informs Barry that he now has to raid a Bolivian stash house with many armed men, which Barry finds extremely dangerous. Meanwhile, the Los Angeles Police Department is forced to bring a technician to unlock the password access, as Moss (Paula Newsome) exceeded the amount of limited options, blocking access to the lipstick camera. Moss then calls Gene (Henry Winkler), who claims to have information regarding Ryan but wants to meet her at a restaurant to disclose the information. Gene attends an audition, which does not seem to impress the casting agents. Sally prepares for her audition with her manager Mike Hallman (Robert Curtis Brown). During this, Mike makes unwelcome advances to an uncomfortable Sally, although he claims he was just joking.

At class, Gene instructs the class to perform Glengarry Glen Ross. Gene criticizes Barry's delivery of the monologue, also calling out his military background to help him improve his acting. The lesson prompts Barry to confront Fuches, telling him he won't participate in the stash house raid and telling Fuches to go back to Cleveland. Sally waits for her audition, a casting assistant asks her about her agent due to a problem. When she tells him that Mike is her manager, the assistant says that they contacted him and Mike now claims not to represent her. Sally leaves the building and breaks down in her car. As Barry drives up to Natalie's party, he daydreams again about a life with Sally, which includes Jon Hamm joining them for a barbecue party. Inspired by this, he decides to buy Sally a new laptop.

At the party, Barry meets with Sally, who lies about her audition and seems uncomfortable with the laptop gift because of their short time together. Needing a connection, Barry texts Chris to come to the party along with two of his Marine friends. Suddenly, Fuches appears at the party, shocking Barry. Fuches tells him he wants him to keep going to acting class and keep his secret, but wants him to continue his duties, giving him papers with intel on the stash house. Barry bonds with Chris at the party, while Natalie seems concerned about Chris' friends, Taylor (Dale Pavinski) and Vaughn (Marcus Brown), who display violent tendencies. Barry gets jealous when he sees Sally spending time with an aspiring actor named Zach Burrows (Ross Philips) and tells him to leave her alone. Sally is angry at Barry's view of her as a "property" instead of a "person", and angrily leaves with Zach. 

Moss meets with Gene at a restaurant. Despite wanting information on Ryan Madison, Gene only uses the opportunity to flirt with her. Although Moss is mad that this was just a date, she decides to stay. After the date is over, she returns to the station, where the technicians managed to unlock the lipstick camera, managing to see a person shooting at the car. However, the image's blurry silhouette prevents them from identifying the hitman. Back at the party, Barry, Chris, Taylor and Vaughn leave for another meeting, with Barry feeling dejected. As Barry climbs on his car, Taylor finds the intel on the stash house and tells Barry that he wants to participate on it.

Production

Development
In February 2018, the episode's title was revealed as "Chapter Four: Commit... to YOU" and it was announced that co-producer Sarah Solemani had written the episode while Maggie Carey had directed it. This was Solemani's first writing credit, and Carey's first directing credit.

Writing
According to Henry Winkler, the episode helped develop Gene's character, with the episode representing him as "the sadness of wanting to be somebody and maybe not becoming that person you want be. So you create it in this artificial space." Winkler also mentioned that the scene where his character auditioned for an extra role expressed "profound sadness" on series creators Bill Hader and Alec Berg.

Reception

Viewers
The episode was watched by 0.511 million viewers, earning a 0.2 in the 18-49 rating demographics on the Nielson ratings scale. This means that 0.2 percent of all households with televisions watched the episode. This was a 15% decrease from the previous episode, which was watched by 0.595 million viewers with a 0.2 in the 18-49 demographics.

Critical reviews

"Chapter Four: Commit... to YOU" received positive reviews. Vikram Murthi of The A.V. Club gave the episode a "B" and wrote, "For the past three episodes, Barry has tried to run from his past, but, predictably, his past keeps catching up to him. He tried to wiggle his way out of killing Ryan Madison only to end up in a position where he kills a car full of Chechens. He tried to leave the hitman business behind only to be forced to kill Paco, the Chechens' informant into the Bolivian gang, because Fuches' life was in danger. But after Barry killed Paco, it seems like all the loose ends had been tied up." 

Nick Harley of Den of Geek wrote, "Most of the comedy this week is supplied by the always fantastic Henry Winkler as Gene Cousineau. We get a peek at Cousineau's life as a working actor and it's just as pathetic as suspected. It further colors his behavior at the acting class, where he's treated like a returning hero at the beginning of each class and uses his position of authority to take back some of the control and respect that he doesn't get elsewhere in his life." Charles Bramesco of Vulture gave the episode a 4 star rating out of 5 and wrote, "The living embodiment of this brain twister is Gene Cousineau, who claims the spotlight this week with a surprisingly intense, layered turn from Henry Winkler. Not unlike Barry, passing for a normal guy in his violent everyday life, Gene is adept at assuming a persona. This episode casts him as two men, one pathetic and ground down by a career of one-line gigs, the other commanding and seductive. Winkler convincingly inhabits both the beta and alpha positions, showing the audience the mushy innards behind the chest he puffs out in class or around women. Gene has less control over how he turns this on and off, however. His problem is not that he's a bad actor, but that he can't do it on command."

Awards and accolades
TVLine named Henry Winkler as an honorable mention as the "Performer of the Week" for the week of April 21, 2018, for his performance in the episode. The site wrote, "This week, Gene hilariously breezed through an audition for the coveted role of 'Man in Back of Line', with Winkler lending Gene an air of serene self-confidence, even in humiliating circumstances. Then the former Fonz got seductively silly as Gene took advantage of the murder of one of his acting students to put the moves on an attractive homicide detective. Actually, the appeal of Winkler's performance is that Gene is so completely comfortable with who he is, and where he is in life. And so is Winkler, it seems: He could be sitting at home counting his Happy Days residuals, but instead, he's giving us this wonderfully entertaining late-career turn."

Winkler submitted this episode for consideration for his Primetime Emmy Award for Outstanding Supporting Actor in a Comedy Series nomination at the 70th Primetime Emmy Awards. He would win the award, earning his first Emmy win.

References

External links
 "Chapter Four: Commit... to YOU" at HBO
 

Barry (TV series) episodes
2018 American television episodes